Adagio is the second studio album by T.H.C., released on July 13, 1999 by Brain Surgery Music. T.H.C. gained some recognition after the songs "Overfire ", "Dip" and "Need to Destroy" appeared in several of episodes of Buffy the Vampire Slayer and its spin-off Angel. The songs were performed as part of the fictional band Shy, of whom Veruca was the vocalist and composer George Sarah the band's keyboard player.

Track listing

Personnel 
Adapted from the Adagio liner notes.

T.H.C.
 George Sarah – instruments, producer

Additional performers
 Sarah Folkman – vocals (1-3, 5-8), design

Production and design
 Lorraine Kay – cover art, illustrations

Release history

References

External links 
 
 Death by Design at iTunes

1999 albums
T.H.C. (band) albums